Niger competed at the 1972 Summer Olympics in Munich, West Germany.  The nation won its first ever Olympic medal at these Games.

Medalists

Bronze
 Issake Dabore — Boxing, Men's Light Welterweight

Boxing
Men

References
Official Olympic Reports
International Olympic Committee results database

Nations at the 1972 Summer Olympics
1972
1972 in Niger